Jonathan Trumbull Jr. (March 26, 1740 – August 7, 1809) was an American politician and military officer who served as the governor of Connecticut, speaker of the United States House of Representatives, and Lieutenant Governor of Connecticut. He is often confused with his younger brother, John Trumbull, a famous artist during the revolutionary war and early years of the United States.

Early life
Trumbull was born in Lebanon, Connecticut, the second son of Jonathan Trumbull Sr. (the eventual Governor of Connecticut) and his wife Faith Robinson, daughter of Rev. John Robinson. Trumbull graduated from Harvard College in 1759, and gave the valedictory address when he received his master's degree in 1762.  His brother John Trumbull was a noted painter of the Revolution.

Career

State and local office
Carrying on the family's tradition of public service, Trumbull began with town and colony offices: lister, grand juror, surveyor of highways, justice of the peace, and selectman. In 1774 he was elected deputy. the first of seven terms representing Lebanon.  He served in the state legislature three times; from 1774 to 1775, from 1779 to 1780, and in 1788, serving as Speaker of the House in 1788.

Revolutionary War
Trumbull served in the Continental Army as paymaster general of the Northern Department from July 28, 1775 to July 29, 1778. In February 1781, he was given the rank of lieutenant colonel.  He was included in the general orders of June 8, 1781: "Jonathan Trumbull. Esqr., Junior, is appointed Secretary to the Commander in Chief and to be respected accordingly." He served for the duration of the war as aide-de-camp to General George Washington until December 28, 1783.  After the war, he became an original member of the Connecticut Society of the Cincinnati.

United States Congress
Elected to the First, Second, and Third Congresses, Trumbull served in the United States House of Representatives from March 4, 1789 to March 3, 1795.  He was the Speaker of the House in the Second Congress, both preceded and succeeded by Frederick A. C. Muhlenberg. He did not seek re-election for a fourth term and instead ran for the United States Senate.

When Trumbull was elected to the United States Senate, he served from March 4, 1795 to June 10, 1796.

Governor of Connecticut
On June 10, 1796, he resigned from the United States Senate to become Lieutenant Governor of Connecticut. When the Governor died in December 1797, he became governor and was re-elected to eleven consecutive terms until his death in Lebanon, Connecticut.

Personal life

Trumbull married Eunice Backus. Together, they had one son and four daughters:
Jonathan Trumbull (b. December 24, 1767, d. January 14, 1768), who died young
Faith Trumbull (b. February 1, 1769), who married Daniel Wadsworth (1771–1848), an artist and architect
Mary Trumbull (b. December 27, 1777)
Harriet Trumbull Silliman (b. September 2, 1783, d. January 1850), who married Benjamin Silliman (1779–1864), a scientist.
Maria Trumbull (b. February 14, 1785).
He was elected a Fellow of the American Academy of Arts and Sciences in 1804.

Trumbull died August 7, 1809, aged 69 years and 134 days. He is interred at Trumbull Cemetery, Lebanon, Connecticut. 
He was one of the original members of the board of trustees of Bacon Academy.

See also
 Trumbull, Connecticut
 Trumbull County, Ohio

References

External links
 

National Governors Association
The American Revolution Institute
The Society of the Cincinnati

1740 births
1809 deaths
Continental Army staff officers
United States Army paymasters
Governors of Connecticut
Members of the United States House of Representatives from Connecticut
Speakers of the United States House of Representatives
United States senators from Connecticut
American people of English descent
Harvard College alumni
Connecticut Federalists
Federalist Party United States senators
Fellows of the American Academy of Arts and Sciences
Members of the Connecticut House of Representatives
Speakers of the Connecticut House of Representatives
Federalist Party state governors of the United States
Military personnel from Connecticut
Aides-de-camp of George Washington
People from Lebanon, Connecticut
People of colonial Connecticut
Burials in Connecticut